The 1931 Victorian Football Association season was the 53rd season of the Australian rules football competition. The premiership was won by the Oakleigh Football Club, after it defeated Northcote by three points in the Grand Final on 26 September. It was the club's second VFA premiership, achieved in only its third season of senior competition, and it was Oakleigh's second premiership in a row.

Premiership 
After playing sectional games in 1930, the Association reverted to a simple season format, with each club playing eighteen home-and-home matches, before the top four clubs contested a finals series under the amended Argus system to determine the premiers for the season.

Ladder

Finals

Awards 
 Don Fraser, Sr. (Oakleigh) was the leading goalkicker for the season, kicking 77 goals in the home-and-home season and 83 goals overall.
 Bill Koop (Prahran) won the Recorder Cup as the Association's best and fairest, polling ten votes. Tom Lahiff (Port Melbourne) finished second with seven votes, and Doug Nicholls (Northcote) finished third with six votes.
 The seconds premiership was won by Brunswick. Brunswick 12.10 (82) defeated Coburg 5.14 (44) in the Grand Final at Preston on 26 September to win the title.

Notable events 
 The Association and League re-established a permit agreement in 1931, meaning that players could not switch from one competition to the other without a clearance from his original competition. This was the first time a permit agreement had existed between the competitions since before the 1925 season.
 Following Coburg's 11-point victory against Port Melbourne on 30 May, Port Melbourne protested the result on the basis of a timekeeping error. The match was declared void, and in the replay on Wednesday 29 July, Coburg 11.15 (81) defeated Port Melbourne 8.17 (65) by 16 points.
 On 15 August, a combined Association team 16.11 (107) defeated a combined New South Wales League team 13.17 (95) by twelve points at the Sydney Cricket Ground, before a crowd of 8,608 spectators.
 Northcote lodged a protest against the result of the Grand Final, requesting the result be quashed a replay be held. Northcote contended that the Oakleigh timekeeper had rung the bell to signal the end of the third quarter approximately five seconds early, and had done so without the permission of the Northcote timekeeper; the ball was in Northcote's forward line at the time, although Oakleigh had possession. The Association found that there was a three to five second discrepancy between the two timekeepers' clocks, but could not say for sure whether the quarter had been played short or long, so it upheld Oakleigh's victory.

External links 
 List of VFA premiers

References 

Victorian Football League seasons
VFL